Kaafu Atoll is the code name given to an administrative division in the Republic of Maldives which consists of the geographical atolls of Kaashidhoo Island, Gaafaru, North Malé Atoll and South Malé Atoll. As the two Malé Atolls are the main islands of the administrative district, the entire Kaafu Atoll administrative division is  officially named Malé Atoll or Malé Atolhu in the Maldivian language, Dhivehi.

The capital of the administrative division is Thulusdhoo.

Although Malé, the capital of the Maldives, and the adjacent islands of Vilingili, Hulhule and Hulhumalé, are geographically part of the North Malé Atoll, they do not form part of the Kaafu Atoll administrative division and are a separate administrative division.

Kaafu or Malé Atoll
Kaafu is a code letter of the Thaana alphabet used in the Maldivian language, Dhivehi, assigned to one of the administrative divisions of the Maldives which is officially and traditionally known by the name Malé Atoll. The Thaana alphabet code names are not the names of the natural or geographical atolls of the Maldives which make up these divisions. These administrative divisions may consist of part of, a single or several natural atolls.

Malé Atoll is the name of two natural atolls which form part of the administrative division of Kaafu Atoll. The two Malé Atolls are North Malé Atoll and South Malé Atoll which are separated by the Vaadhoo Kandu. Malé and Thulusdhoo are both located in North Malé Atoll.

Geography
The Malé or Kaafu Atoll administrative division consists of the geographic or natural atolls of North Malé Atoll, South Malé Atoll, Gaafaru Atoll and Kaashidhoo Island. The atolls consists of Inhabited Islands and Uninhabited Island, a definition which includes resort islands, airport islands and industrial islands.

Although Malé, Hulhulé, Hulhumalé and Villingili are geographically part of North Malé Atoll, they are not part of the Kaafu Atoll administrative division and are part of the separate Malé City administrative division.

Inhabited islands

Resort islands
Resort islands are classified as Uninhabited Islands which have been converted to become resorts. 

The following are the resort islands, with the official name of the resort.

Other Uninhabited Islands

Gallery

References 

 Divehi Tārīkhah Au Alikameh. Divehi Bahāi Tārikhah Khidmaiykurā Qaumī Markazu. Reprint 1958 edn. Malé 1990.
 Divehiraajjege Jōgrafīge Vanavaru. Muhammadu Ibrahim Lutfee. G.Sōsanī.
 Xavier Romero-Frias, The Maldive Islanders, A Study of the Popular Culture of an Ancient Ocean Kingdom. Barcelona 1999. 

Administrative atolls of the Maldives